Saint-Clément is a municipality in the Canadian province of Quebec, located in Les Basques Regional County Municipality in the Bas-Saint-Laurent region.

Demographics

Population

Language

References

External links
 

Municipalities in Quebec
Incorporated places in Bas-Saint-Laurent